Knjaževac is a town and municipality located in the Zaječar District of the eastern Serbia. As of 2011, the municipality has a population of 31,491 inhabitants, while the town has 18,404 inhabitants.

The town is situated between three mountains, in the geographical region of the Timok Valley bordering Bulgaria.

History
In the Roman period, Timacum Minus existed within the present municipality. In 1833, the town, formerly known as Gurgusovac, was liberated from the Ottoman Empire and was administrated into the Krajina nahija of the Principality of Serbia in 1834. In 1859 the official name was changed to Knjaževac. From 1929 to 1944, Knjaževac was part of the Morava Banovina of the Kingdom of Yugoslavia. In 1944, a train tunnel was built in the town, which is depicted in the town's coat of arms.

Gurgusovac Tower
During the Ottoman period, the fortress, known as the Gurgusovac Tower, after the then name of the town, was built with a purpose to control the Niš-Vidin road. Strategically located, encompassed by the rampart and a deep trench, the fort hosted the company of 100 soldiers.

After the liberation from the Ottomans, the fort lost its strategic importance and was turned into a dungeon-type prison. Numerous adversaries of Prince Alexander Karađorđević and the Defenders of the Constitution regime were jailed in the tower. Due to its notoriety because of the torture and abuse, it became a symbol of suffering and was nicknamed the "Serbian Bastille". After Prince Miloš Obrenović returned to Serbia in 1858 and replaced Alexander Karađorđević, he visited Gurgusovac and ordered for the tower to be burned to the ground. The tower was razed, with only one wall and an entry gate remaining, while in order to commemorate the prince's decision, the name of the town of Gurgusovac was changed to Knјаževac ("Prince's town") on 17 January 1859.

In the 2010s, the area of the former tower was adapted into the open-air cultural venue, including the summer stage. The wall and the gate were kept while the additional walls were rebuilt on the remaining foundations.

Geography
The municipality extends over an area of 1202 km2 and is the sixth largest in the Republic of Serbia. Its countryside is mostly hilly and mountainous.

The highest point in the territory of the municipality is Midžor on Stara Planina (2169 m), which is also the second highest peak in the Republic of Serbia. The lowest point is 176 metres high and is situated in the Knjaževac valley. There are 86 inhabited places in the municipality of which 85 are villages. The town itself is situated at the confluence of the Trgoviški Timok and the Svrljiški Timok which become the Beli Timok. It flows on towards Zaječar, merges with the Crni Timok and becomes simply, Timok. It is this river that gives name to the Timok Valley region.

Knjaževac is connected with other towns by road and railroad traffic. It is located between the latitudes of 43°20' and 43°45' north and between the longitudes 22°11' and 22°41' east.

Climate
Knjaževac has an humid subtropical climate (Köppen climate classification: Cfa), that's very close to a humid continental climate (Köppen climate classification: Dfb). Average annual rainfall is 605 mm/m2. There are 306 sunny days and 21 days with snow in a year.

Demographics

According to the 2011 census results, the municipality of Knjaževac has 31,491 inhabitants, of which 18,404 inhabitants live in urban area. The average population density is 26.2 inhabitants per square kilometer making it a sparsely populated municipality.

Ethnic groups
The ethnic composition of the municipality:

Economy
The following table gives a preview of total number of registered people employed in legal entities per their core activity (as of 2018):

Tourism
Knjaževac, with its Babin Zub ski center offers opportunities for tourism and sports events. Its picnic areas are set in areas of natural beauty (like Banjica, Baranica and other), places for rest and recreation. The 14th-century Church of the Holy Mother of God lies in the nearby village of Donja Kamenica. In 2014, Knjaževac was chosen as the outstanding destination in Europe. (Project EDEN Network)

Notable people
 Nenad Marinković, footballer 
 Milos Milos, actor and bodyguard of Alain Delon
 Tihomir Đorđević,  ethnologist, folklorist, cultural historian and professor at the University of Belgrade.

Gallery

International relations

Twin towns — Sister cities
Knjaževac is twinned with:
  Belogradchik, Bulgaria, since 2011.
  Novi Bečej, Serbia

See also
 List of places in Serbia

References

External links

 Official website

Populated places in Zaječar District
Timok Valley
Municipalities and cities of Southern and Eastern Serbia